Ariel Gerardo Seltzer (born 3 January 1981 in Ituzaingó, Buenos Aires) is an Argentine football defender who currently plays for Unión de Mar del Plata in the Torneo Argentino A.

Besides playing club football, he has represented his country at Under-20 level and was part of José Pekerman's side that won the 2001 FIFA World Youth Championship.

Playing career
A longtime defender at Argentinos Juniors, Selzter was set to make a move to Israeli football in 2006. Beitar Jerusalem had allegedly agreed terms with his club in Argentina. Beitar revealed that Seltzer's grandfather was Jewish and hoped that he would be able to gain Israeli citizenship via the Law of Return. After finding that Seltzer was ineligible for emigration under the terms of the law of return, Beitar rescinded their transfer offer and the player continued to play in Argentina.

References

External links
 Ariel Seltzer at BDFA.com.ar 
 Ariel Seltzer – Argentine Primera statistics at Fútbol XXI 
 Last match at matchendirect.net

1981 births
Living people
Argentine Jews
Argentine footballers
Argentina under-20 international footballers
Association football defenders
Argentine Primera División players
Argentinos Juniors footballers
Independiente Rivadavia footballers
People from Ituzaingó Partido
Sportspeople from Buenos Aires Province